Hyannis Harbor is a small natural harbor located in the village of Hyannis in the town of Barnstable, Massachusetts.

External links
Congressional book on construction projects in the harbor

Ports and harbors of Massachusetts
Geography of Barnstable County, Massachusetts
Transportation in Barnstable County, Massachusetts
Massachusetts natural resources
Barnstable, Massachusetts